Sirig is a village located in the Temerin municipality, in the South Bačka District of Serbia. It is situated in the Autonomous Province of Vojvodina. The village has a Serb ethnic majority and its population numbering 3,010 people (2002 census).

Historical population

1961: 2,269
1971: 2,201
1981: 2,286
1991: 2,542
2002: 3,010
2020: 3700

See also
Kamendin, Sirig
List of places in Serbia
List of cities, towns and villages in Vojvodina

References
Slobodan Ćurčić, Broj stanovnika Vojvodine, Novi Sad, 1996.

External links
temerin.org

Places in Bačka
Populated places in South Bačka District
Temerin